Cause for Alarm is a novel by Eric Ambler first published in 1938. Set in Fascist Italy in that year, the book is one of Ambler's classic spy thrillers.

Plot summary
Nicholas Marlow, an English engineer engaged to a young doctor, loses his well-paid job. Increasingly desperate, he responds to an advert from an English engineering company, the Spartacus Machine Tool Company of Wolverhampton. The firm manufactures the "Spartacus Type S2 automatic" boring machine, which is used for shell production. Able to speak some Italian, he is offered the post of the firm's representative in Italy. Marlow gladly accepts, secretly deciding that he will quit the job as soon as possible to go back to England and get married.

On arrival in Milan, Marlow discovers there is a huge backlog at his office, and that his personal assistant Bellinetti is highly inefficient. A lot of his time is diverted by the Italian authorities, to whom he has to report on a regular basis and who eventually claim that they have misplaced his passport so he is unable to leave the country. There is growing uneasiness on Marlow's part when he notices his private correspondence with his fiancée has been steamed open. He makes friends with Andreas Zaleshoff, a Russian spy whose office is in the same building. Marlow learns that his predecessor was murdered, and that Bellinetti is an agent for the OVRA.

Marlow is contacted by a General Vagas, a Yugoslav of German descent, who asks Marlow to spy for him. Zaleshoff informs Marlow that Vagas is actually a German agent, and encourages Marlow to accept the offer and feed Vagas information supplied by Zaleshoff. Zaleshoff's intention is to sow discord in the alliance between Italy and Germany.

Vagas's wife reports him to the Italian authorities, and an arrest warrant is issued for Marlow. Assisted by Zaleshoff and his sister Tamara, Marlow succeeds in escaping from Milan. The two men embark on a several-day-long journey by train and on foot until they reach the Yugoslav border. From Zagreb, Marlow can safely travel home to England.

Context

Like many of Ambler's novels, it features an amateur hero who is out of his depth.

The characters of Zaleshoff and Tamara also play a significant role in Ambler's novel Uncommon Danger.

References

1938 British novels
Novels by Eric Ambler
British spy novels
Alfred A. Knopf books
Novels set in Italy
Fiction set in 1938
Hodder & Stoughton books